Gupteshwar Pandey is a retired Indian Police Service officer. He served as Director General of Police of Bihar. He has taken voluntary retirement on 22 September 2020, five months before completion of his service tenure (28 February 2021). He was succeeded by Sanjeev Kumar Singhal.

Early life and education 
Gupteshwar Pandey was born in 1961 in Geruabandh village of buxar district.  His village was away from basic facilities like electricity, health, education, and roads. After completing his intermediate, he studied at Patna University. He earlier appeared for the UPSC exam in Sanskrit Language and was allotted Indian Revenue Service - Income Tax after which he reappeared for UPSC and joined the Indian Police Service in 1987 and was allotted Bihar Cadre.

Career at the Indian Police Service 
He served as superintendent of police in several major districts of Bihar. While serving as inspector-general of police of the Tirhut Division Muzaffarpur Range, he started many initiatives to curb crime and make police people-friendly.

Alcohol ban campaign 
In November 2015, the Bihar Government banned alcohol. Gupteswar Pandey travelled across Bihar and campaigned for an alcohol ban.

Political career 
Pandey earlier applied for VRS (Voluntary Retirement Scheme) before the 2014 Lok Sabha election but he was not given a ticket from Buxar constituency, later he withdrew his VRS application. In 2020, after quick approval of his VRS from Governor Fagu Chauhan, an exception was made in his case with the waiver of a mandatory three-month-long cooling-off period for government servants to join politics. Pandey joined Janata Dal (United) on 27 September 2020 at party supremo and Chief Minister Nitish Kumar’s residence in Patna.

References

Further reading

External links 

Living people
1961 births
Indian police officers
Bihar Police
Janata Dal (United) politicians